Rev. James Hinton Knowles (1856–1943) was a British Missionary to Kashmir in 19th century. He had visited Kashmir in the 1880s and authored two important books about Kashmiri language and culture. He was the first principal of the renowned Tyndale Biscoe School Kashmir from 1876 to 1880. He was succeeded Reverend F.E.Lucey A.M.

Published works

A Dictionary Of Kashmiri Proverbs And Sayings
A Dictionary Of Kashmiri Proverbs And Sayings is a detailed collection of Kashmiri proverbs and sayings. It was published in 1888 in Bombay, British India.

Folk-Tales Of Kashmir
Folk-Tales Of Kashmir was published in 1893 in London. The book contains 40 fables and about 100 odd folk tales.

See also
Cecil Tyndale-Biscoe
Walter Roper Lawrence

References

External links
 Archived books

Year of birth missing
British writers
British Protestant missionaries
Protestant missionaries in India